Cessnock is a city in the Hunter Region of New South Wales, Australia, about  by road west of Newcastle. It is the administrative centre of the City of Cessnock LGA and was named after an 1826 grant of land called Cessnock Estate, which was owned by John Campbell. The local area was once known as "The Coalfields", and it is the gateway city to the vineyards of the Hunter Valley, which includes Pokolbin, Mount View, Lovedale, Broke, Rothbury, and Branxton.

History
The Wonnarua people are the Traditional Owners of the Cessnock area. Many were killed or died as a result of European diseases after colonisation. Others were forced onto neighbouring tribal territory and killed. The city of Cessnock features many Indigenous place names including Congewai, Kurri Kurri, Laguna, Nulkaba and Wollombi.

Lying between Australia's earliest European settlements – Sydney, the Hawkesbury River and Newcastle, pastoralists commenced settlement of the land in the 1820s. Cessnock was named by Scottish settler John Campbell, after his grandfather's baronial Cessnock Castle in Galston, East Ayrshire, to reflect the aristocratic heritage and ambitions for this estate. The township of Cessnock developed from 1850, as a service centre at the junction of the Great North Road from Sydney to the Hunter Valley, with branches to Maitland and Singleton.

The establishment of the South Maitland coalfields generated extensive land settlement between 1903 and 1923. The current pattern of urban development, transport routes and industrial landscape was laid at this time. The surveying of the Greta coal seam by Professor Edgeworth David around 1888 became the impetus for considerable social and economic change in the area with the development of the coal mining industry.

Demographics

According to the 2016 census of Population, there were 21,725 people in the Cessnock urban centre.
 Aboriginal and Torres Strait Islander people made up 8.2% of the population. 
 86.8% of people were born in Australia. The next most common countries of birth were England 1.6%, New Zealand 0.9% and Scotland 0.5%.   
 88.3% of people spoke only English at home. 
 The most common responses for religion were Anglican 27.5%, No Religion 24.6% and Catholic 18.9%.

Economy

The decline of mining on the South Maitland Coalfields has been paralleled by growth in the wine industry and better access to other employment centres.

The Hunter Valley wine-growing area near Cessnock is Australia's oldest wine region and one of the most famous, with around  under vine. The vineyards of Pokolbin, Mount View and Allandale, with their rich volcanic soils tended by entrepreneurial vignerons, are also the focus of a thriving and growing tourism industry. The extension and eventual completion of the F3 Freeway, created a property and tourism boom during the 1990s.

Cessnock has begun to develop other tourist ventures beyond the wine industry such as championship golf courses, hot air ballooning, sky-diving, and guest house accommodation.

The city council has actively pursued a policy of urban renewal in the city centre since 2001. The local council was one of the first to introduce a recycling program for waste disposal in the state. 

Most employment comes from the local port city of Newcastle, the nearby major centres of Maitland and Singleton and in service industries in the local council area, which comprises many small towns, such as Kurri Kurri, Weston, Neath, Abernethy, Kearsley and Pokolbin.

Geography
The town is located in the rich alluvial and volcanic soils of the Hunter Valley. Rich coal seams underlie much of the area. The Brokenback Range (part of the Great Dividing Range) rises to the west of the city. Cessnock lies within the Hunter Valley Important Bird Area.

Climate
Cessnock has a humid subtropical climate (Cfa) with hot summers and cool winters, similar to Penrith, a suburb in Greater Western Sydney to the south. Summers may be dry due to their inland location, but humid days are not uncommon. Winters are usually dry with cold nights, which may be frosty.

Education

Primary schools
 St Philip's Christian College
 Cessnock Public School
 Nulkaba Public School
 Cessnock East Public School
 Bellbird Public School
 Cessnock West Public School
 Kearsley Public School
 St Patricks Primary

High schools
 Cessnock High School
 Mount View High School
 St Phillips Christian College

Tertiary facilities
 Hunter Institute of TAFE  Cessnock Campus

Media
Cessnock is serviced by a number of regional newspapers, radio stations and television stations.

Print
The Cessnock Advertiser; an adjunct to the Mercury and is published every Wednesday. With a circulation of approximately 17,000
The Maitland Mercury
The Newcastle Herald

Radio
Radio stations include:

AM stations
 2HD (commercial)
 1233 ABC Newcastle (ABC Local Radio)
 2HRN (off band commercial)
 Sky Sports Radio (as part of statewide network)

FM stations
 KOFM 102.9FM (commercial)
 hit106.9 Newcastle 106.9FM (commercial)
 New FM 105.3FM (commercial)
 2NUR 103.7FM (community)
 2CHR (Central Hunter Radio) 96.5 FM –  (community)
 Rhema FM Newcastle 99.7FM (Christian)

Government broadcasters
 Australian Broadcasting Corporation
 1233 ABC Newcastle
 ABC Radio National
 ABC News Radio
 Triple J (youth station)
 ABC Classic FM (classical music)
 SBS Radio (foreign language service)

Television
Cessnock is part of the Newcastle-Hunter Region television market, which is served by 5 television networks, three commercial and two national services (which include new sub-channels that started in 2009 for the commercial networks and in recent years from the national services). . These networks are listed as follows:

 NBN Television, GEM and GO! (Nine Network affiliate, incumbent station, (NBN TV) established 1962).
 WIN Television, One and Eleven (Network Ten affiliate, (formerly known as Southern Cross Ten, TEN Northern N.S.W. and NRTV) was established as a result of aggregation on 31 December 1991).
 Prime7 (formerly known as Prime Television), 7Two and 7mate  (Seven Network  / Prime affiliate was established as a result of aggregation on 31 December 1991 but swallowed).
 ABC Television including ABC1, ABC2/ABC 4 Kids , ABC3 and ABC News 24 is owned by the government. The ABC TV service was established in the 1960s.
 SBS Television including SBS ONE and SBS Two is owned by the government. This service was introduced in the 1980s.

NBN Television produces an evening news bulletin combining local, state, national and international news screening nightly at 6.00PM, while subscription television service Foxtel is also available via satellite.

Digital Media 
Cessnock was featured in national tech news in 2020 with the release of a video game called Cessnock.Life, which is a fictional simulation game based in Cessnock.

Performance Arts Culture Cessnock (PACC) 
The PACC is a Local Government owned Theatre that holds concerts, plays and community events. Originally opened in 2008 and Known as the Cessnock Performing Arts Centre it frequently has acts shows such as comedians, Tribute Bands and Musicals. Aswell as other events such as drama lessons.

Sport

The city has many sporting facilities. The city competes in several regional sporting competitions, particularly the Cessnock Goannas competing in Newcastle-based rugby league competition. Some very successful sporting players can trace their roots to the local district, including Australian Rugby League representative players and brothers Andrew and Matthew Johns. World-renowned golfer and TV commentator Jack Newton is also from Cessnock. His annual Sub-Juniors Golf Tournament has unearthed some talented young golfers and is held on the local championship courses of Pokolbin. Cessnock was the base camp for the Japan national football team during the 2015 AFC Asian Cup.

Transport
For a century Cessnock was served by the South Maitland Railway network, originally constructed for the coal industry, but which, at one time, had considerable passenger services, including a direct train to Sydney known as the Cessnock Flyer.

The Sydney-Newcastle Freeway's Cessnock exit at Freemans Waterhole provides one of the main road connections from Sydney to Cessnock via "The Gap", a pass through the Watagan Mountains range just north of Mount Heaton.

Until the Hunter Expressway opened in 2014, linking the New England Highway at Branxton and the Sydney-Newcastle Freeway at West Wallsend, through traffic passed through Cessnock.

The local airport is placed just to the north of the city, at the entrance to the Vineyard District. It has a small public passenger terminal and also serves as the base for aviation training organisations such as Avondale College's school of Aviation and Hunter Valley Aviation. The airport is not served by RPT flights.

The local bus service is run by Rover Coaches which provide services to Maitland, Newcastle and Morisset and school bus services.

Notable people
 Douglas N. Daft, businessman; CEO of Coca-Cola (2000–04), and Corporate Director of Wal-Mart
 Joel Edwards, rugby league player
 Andrew Johns, rugby league player
 Matthew Johns, rugby league player
 Gavin King, journalist; newspaper columnist
 Bruce Litchfield, architect
 Kenneth Neate, opera singer
 Jack Newton, professional golfer
 Bill Peden, rugby league player
 Frank Rickwood, President of BP Alaska, Chairman of Oil Search
 Don Schofield, Rugby League Player
 Simon Whitlock, Professional Darts Player
 Rod McCormack, multi times National Guitar and Banjo Champion, Australian Musician of the year,
 Jeff McCormack, Multi Golden Guitar winner, Australian musician of the year

National Estate

Greater Cessnock contains a number of buildings and sites that are on the Register of the National Estate.

 Court House, Branxton
 Police Station and Residence, Branxton
 Former Court House, Greta
 Kurri Kurri Hotel, Lang and Hampden Streets, Kurri Kurri
 Richmond Main Colliery, Mulbring Rd, Pelaw Main
 Laguna House, Laguna
 Post Office, Wollombi
 Endeavour Museum (former Court House), Wollombi
 Public School, Wollombi
 St Michael's Catholic Church, Wollombi
 St John the Evangelist Anglican Church, Wollombi
 Stanford Main No.2 Colliery Pit Head Building, Brick Cottages
 Aboriginal Rock Carvings Site, popularly known as Baiame Cave, Milbrodale Area

Crime 
In 2021, Cessnock had an amphetamine use/possession rate of 137.1 per 100,000, which is significantly higher than the NSW state average of 90.0 per 100,000.

The suburb of Cessnock had an assault incidents crime rate of 1264.6 per 100,000 people in 2019, which is significantly higher than the NSW state average of 822.3 during the same period.

See also

 Cessnock Correctional Centre
 City of Cessnock
 Electoral District of Cessnock

References

External links

 
 Visitor's Guide to Cessnock – Visit NSW

Cities in New South Wales
Suburbs of City of Cessnock
Towns in the Hunter Region
Mining towns in New South Wales